Cloete's Pass is situated in the Western Cape province of South Africa, on the Regional road R327 between Van Wyksdorp and Herbertsdale. The Langeberg mountain range separates the southern Cape coast from the Little Karoo. One of the little-known passes is the Cloete's pass, named after the Cloete family who owned the farm there. It is a gravel pass that features many flowering plants and ruins of old toll houses and blockhouses built by the British during the Anglo-Boer war.

External links 
 Passes Index at Wild Dog Adventure Riding website

Mountain passes of the Western Cape